Clay County is a county located in the U.S. state of Kentucky. As of the 2020 census, the county population was 20,345. Its county seat is Manchester. The county was formed in 1807 and named in honor of Green Clay (1757–1826). Clay was a member of the Virginia and Kentucky State legislatures, first cousin once removed of Henry Clay, U.S. Senator from Kentucky and Secretary of State in the 19th century.

History
Clay County was established in 1807 from land given by Floyd, Knox and Madison counties. The courthouse burned in January 1936.

Geography

Adjacent counties
 Owsley County  (north)
 Perry County  (northeast)
 Leslie County  (east)
 Bell County  (southeast)
 Knox County  (southwest)
 Laurel County  (west)
 Jackson County  (northwest)

Watercourses
 Sexton Creek
 Bullskin Creek
 South Fork of Kentucky River
 Red Bird River
 Big Creek
 Bear Creek
 Goose Creek
 Horse Creek
 Laurel Creek
 Little Goose Creek 
 Wildcat Creek
 Collins Creek
 South Fork of Rockcastle River

Demographics

As of the census of 2010, there were 21,730 people, 8,556 households, and 6,442 families residing in the county.  The population density was 52 people per square mile (20/km2).  There were 9,439 housing units at an average density of 20 per square mile (8/km2).  The racial makeup of the county was 93.9% White, 4.8% Black or African American, 0.2% Native American, 0.1% Asian, <0.1% Pacific Islander, 0.2% from other races, and 0.7% from two or more races.  1.4% of the population were Hispanics or Latinos of any race.

There were 8,556 households, out of which 36.9% had children under the age of 18 living with them, 58.6% were married couples living together, 12.4% had a female householder with no husband present, and 24.7% were non-families. 22.5% of all households were made up of individuals, and 9.0% had someone living alone who was 65 years of age or older.  The average household size was 2.62 and the average family size was 3.06.

The age distribution was 25.4% under the age of 18, 9.2% from 18 to 24, 32.6% from 25 to 44, 22.5% from 45 to 64, and 10.3% who were 65 years of age or older.  The median age was 35 years. For every 100 females, there were 111.7 males.  For every 100 females age 18 and over, there were 112.6 males.

The median income for a household in the county was $16,271, and the median income for a family was $18,925. Males had a median income of $24,164 versus $17,816 for females. The per capita income for the county was $9,716.  About 35.4% of families and 39.7% of the population were below the poverty line, including 47.6% of those under the age of 18 and 31.3% of those age 65 or over.

The county's per-capita income and median household income make it one of the poorest counties in the United States. Among counties whose population contains a non-Hispanic white majority, Clay County was once the poorest by per-capita income and second to another county in the same Kentucky region, Owsley County, by median household income. However, in recent years the economic status of Clay County, Kentucky has improved relative to other lower income counties.

Communities

City
 Manchester (county seat)

Census-designated places
 Littleton
 Oneida

Unincorporated towns and villages

 Big Creek
 Fall Rock
 Garrard
 Goose Rock
 Hubbardsville
 Sibert

Post offices
Many former post offices were, and some current ones are, located along the waterways, which are paralleled by modern roads.
Arrows denote renamings.

 Alger
 Bernice
 Barcreek
 Barger
 Bessie → Mill Pond
 Big Creek
 Bluehole
 Botto
 Brightshade
 Brutus
 Bullskin
 Bullskin Creek
 Burning Springs
 Caution
 Cedral
 Chesnut Hill → Chesnut
 Chesnutburg
 Potters Choice → Choice
 Cottongim
 Disappoint
 Eriline
 Eros
 Ethal → Ethel
 Fall Rock
 Garrard
 Goose Rock
 Grace
 Hacker → Hensley
 Hollingsworth
 Hooker
 Crawfish → Hima
 Laurel Creek
 Lincoln
 Lipps
 Lockards
 Malcom
 Marcum
 Martins Creek
 Mount Welcome
 Adela → Murray → Muncie Fork
 Ogle
 Annalee → Redbird River → Peabody
 Panco
 Pancone
 Pigeonroost
 Plank
 Rockgap
 Seth
 Sibert
 Sory
 Spurlock
 Tanksley
 Tinker
 Treadway
 Wildcat
 Sacker Gap
 Seeley
 Sextons Creek
 Smallwood
 Sourwood
 Urban
 Vine
 Wages

Other places

 Benge
 Brooks
 Buzzard
 Datha
 Fogertown
 Greenbriar
 Hector
 Hubbardsville
 Larue
 Philpot
 Pinhook

There are also places named in early censuses, some still identifiable today: Ammie, Ashers Fork, Creekville, Deer Lick, Felty, Gardner, Jacks Creek, McWhorter, Portersburg, Queendale, Shepherdtown, Sidell, Spring Creek, Teges, and Trixie.

Politics
Clay County has been rock-ribbed Republican since the Civil War, having last voted for a Democratic nominee for president in 1860 when it supported Kentucky native and Southern Democrat John C. Breckinridge. In the last one hundred years the only Republicans to receive less than sixty percent were Bob Dole, who still won the county by nearly 25 percent, and Barry Goldwater, who held the county by seventy-five votes amidst a Democratic landslide in 1964. In 2008 John McCain received 77.5% of the vote.

The county is located in Kentucky's 5th congressional district represented by Representative Hal Rogers.

Health
In July 2010, The Washington Post named Clay County the unhealthiest county in Kentucky, and one of the unhealthiest in the nation. Clay County also featured prominently in a June 2014 article in The New York Times about the difficulty of living in poverty in eastern Kentucky, ranking last in overall ratings for counties in the United States.  The factors which accounted for Clay county's low ranking were unemployment, prevalence of disabilities, obesity, income, and education. The Times declared Clay County the "hardest place to live in the U.S."

Life expectancy
Of 3,142 counties in the United States in 2014, Clay County ranked 3,137 in the longevity of female residents and 3,109 in the longevity of male residents. Males in Clay County lived an average of 68.6 years and females lived an average of 73.6 years compared to the national average for longevity of 76.5 for males and 81.2 for females. Moreover, the average longevity in Clay County declined by 0.4 years for males and 3.4 years for females between 1985 and 2014 compared to a national average for the same period of an increased life span of 5.5 years for men and 3.1 years for women. High rates of smoking and obesity and a low level of physical activity appear to be contributing factors to the lowered longevity for both sexes.

See also

 National Register of Historic Places listings in Clay County, Kentucky
 Red Bird River Petroglyphs

References

Further reading

External links
 Clay County News and Photos at Claylive.com
 

 
1807 establishments in Kentucky
Populated places established in 1807
Kentucky counties
Counties of Appalachia